A first dance is the opening dance in various traditions.

First Dance may refer to:
 First Dance (EP), a 1995 EP by Michael Bublé
 "First Dance" (song), a 2009 song by Justin Bieber
 The First Dance, a 2009 album by Bridezilla